The Provincial Archives of Alberta is the official archives of the Canadian Province of Alberta.  It preserves and makes available for research both private and government records of all media related to Alberta. The Provincial Archives of Alberta also serves as the permanent archival repository of the Government of Alberta. The organization is situated in the Ministry of Culture, Multiculturalism and Status of Women.

History 

The origin of the Provincial Archives dates back to 1908 when Katharine Hughes served as the first Provincial Archivist within the Provincial Library. Through the years the holdings continued to grow.

In 1962, the Government of Alberta established a Museums Branch under the Department of the Provincial Secretary for the establishment of a Provincial Archives and a Provincial Museum. The Branch began to accept archival records from government and private sources in 1963. In 1965 work began on a new Provincial Museum and Archives building in the Glenora district of Edmonton. Work finished and the building officially opened in 1967.

As the years went by the Provincial Archives of Alberta outgrew its space and began to warehouse collections, and the need for a larger building became apparent. The Provincial Archives officially opened the doors to its new location at 8555 Roper Road NW in Edmonton on October 5, 2003. The custom 11,000 m2 building is situated on a six-hectare (14.8-acre) site in southeast Edmonton.

Funding for the construction of the new building was made possible through grants from the  Alberta Centennial Legacies Grant Program

Collection 
The collection includes:
  of government textual records
  of private textual records
 131,363 maps, plans, and architectural drawings
 1,472,741 Photographs
 58,013 objects of audiovisual holdings including film, video and audio recordings
 14,354 volumes of library holdings

Reference services 

Public interaction with the Provincial Archives of Alberta is primarily through the Sandra Thomson Reading Room which is open to the public five days a week and staffed full-time by professional archivists. The archivists are available to give advice on the primary sources that may respond to researchers' inquiries.

The Sandra Thomson Reading Room has the following major sources:

Alberta homestead records;
newspapers; 
city directories; 
Vital Statistics records; 
local history books; 
census records; 
passenger lists; 
Alberta divorce and probate records; 
Alberta court records; 
United Church of Canada records; 
Missionary Oblates of Mary Immaculate records; 
Anglican Church of Canada records; and 
Evangelical Lutheran Church in Canada records.

The Provincial Archives of Alberta promotes Alberta's history and in this way makes the Archives relevant to future users through:

Special events and exhibits which highlight the holdings;
school programs with curriculum ties;
teacher resource packages with curriculum ties;
website – holdings online and to promote services; and
various communication strategies that build awareness of the resources available in the Provincial Archives holdings.

References 

(1)  Alberta Government. Ministry of Culture and Tourism. Heritage and Museums. Alberta Government. Culture and Tourism Website. Retrieved June 23, 2015.
(2)  A Brief History of the Provincial Archives. Provincial Archives of Alberta Website. Retrieved November 29, 2012.
(3)   Historical Resources Act, R.S.A.2000. Alberta Queen's Printer Website. Retrieved November 29, 2012.
(4)  Records Management Regulation 224/2001 Alberta Queen's Printer Website. Retrieved November 29, 2012.

External links 
  Reference Services at the Provincial Archives of Alberta – Detailed Information 
  Exhibits at the Provincial Archives of Alberta
  Online Search of Holdings at the Provincial Archives of Alberta

Archives in Canada
Alberta government departments and agencies
State archives
Organizations based in Alberta